Jackson School District or Jackson County School District (JCSD) may refer to:

 Jackson City School, Jackson, Kentucky
 Jackson County Public Schools (Kentucky), headquarters in McKee
 Jackson County Public Schools (North Carolina), headquarters in Sylva
 Jackson County School District (Alabama)
 Jackson County School District (Arkansas)
 Jackson County School Board
 Jackson County School District (Mississippi)
 Jackson County Schools (West Virginia), headquarters in Ripley
 Jackson Local School District, in Stark County, Ohio
 Jackson Public School District, in Jackson, Mississippi
 Jackson School District (New Jersey), in Jackson Township

Jackson School District also may refer to:
 Jackson County School District, former name of Central Point School District in Oregon